Kostyantyn Odolskyi (born 5 January 1989) is a professional Ukrainian football goalkeeper played in the professional Ukrainian Premier League club Metalurh Donetsk. He is the product of the RVUFk Kyiv school system.

References 
Profile on Football Squads

1989 births
Living people
Ukrainian footballers
FC Metalurh Donetsk players
FC Urartu players
Expatriate footballers in Armenia
Ukrainian expatriate footballers
Association football goalkeepers
Armenian Premier League players
FC Bukovyna Chernivtsi players
FC Krystal Kherson players
FC Ahrobiznes Volochysk players
Ukrainian First League players